Czech Republic Grand Prix can refer to:

Czechoslovakian Grand Prix, a Formula One motor race
Czech Republic motorcycle Grand Prix
Speedway Grand Prix of Czech Republic